This is a list of the mammal species recorded in Wallis and Futuna. There are five mammal species in Wallis and Futuna, all of which are marine mammals of the order Cetacea.

The following tags are used to highlight each species' conservation status as assessed by the International Union for Conservation of Nature:

Order: Cetacea (whales) 

The order Cetacea includes whales, dolphins and porpoises. They are the mammals most fully adapted to aquatic life with a spindle-shaped nearly hairless body, protected by a thick layer of blubber, and forelimbs and tail modified to provide propulsion underwater.

Suborder: Odontoceti
Superfamily: Platanistoidea
Family: Ziphidae
Subfamily: Hyperoodontinae
Genus: Mesoplodon
 Blainville's beaked whale, Mesoplodon densirostris DD
 Ginkgo-toothed beaked whale, Mesoplodon ginkgodens DD
Family: Delphinidae (marine dolphins)
Genus: Stenella
 Spinner dolphin, Stenella longirostris LR/cd
Genus: Lagenodelphis
 Fraser's dolphin, Lagenodelphis hosei DD
Genus: Feresa
 Pygmy killer whale, Feresa attenuata DD

Notes

References

See also
List of chordate orders
Lists of mammals by region
List of prehistoric mammals
Mammal classification
List of mammals described in the 2000s

Fauna of Wallis and Futuna
Wallis and Futuna
Wallis and Futuna Islands
Mammals